Timofey Vladimirovich Kiryanov (born 10 December 1970) is a former Russian football player.

References

1970 births
Living people
Soviet footballers
Russian footballers
FC Chernomorets Novorossiysk players
Russian Premier League players
FC Ural Yekaterinburg players
Association football midfielders
Association football forwards